Adam Raška (born November 26, 1994) is a Czech professional ice hockey forward currently playing with Czech Extraliga side HC Kometa Brno. He last played for UK Elite Ice Hockey League (EIHL) side Sheffield Steelers.

Playing career
Raška made his Czech Extraliga debut playing with HC Kometa Brno debut during the 2012–13 Czech Extraliga season.

References

External links

1994 births
Living people
Czech ice hockey forwards
HC Kometa Brno players
Motor České Budějovice players
Orli Znojmo players
People from Kopřivnice
Piráti Chomutov players
SK Horácká Slavia Třebíč players
BK Mladá Boleslav players
Sheffield Steelers players
Sportspeople from the Moravian-Silesian Region
Czech expatriate sportspeople in England
Czech expatriate ice hockey people
Expatriate ice hockey players in England